Girimekhala is the elephant that carries Mara in Theravada Buddhism.

Buddhist tradition
Its height is 250 yojana. When Mara and his army of evil tried to prevent the future Buddha from achieving enlightenment, the Buddha asked the earth to bear testimony for his deeds and Girimekhala fell in front of the Buddha.

Girimekhala appears in the Buddhist chant Buddha-jaya-maṅgala Gāthā (Verses of the Buddha's Auspicious Victories):

Popular culture

Video games
Girimekhala has made appearances in video games including:
Megami Tensei series
Shin Megami Tensei: Persona series
Shin Megami Tensei: Devil Children series
Dragon Quest IX: Sentinels of the Starry Skies
Dragon Warrior Monsters
Dragon Warrior Monsters 2
Final Fantasy XIV
Tokyo Afterschool Summoners

Television
In The Real Ghostbusters, Winston battles against a demon pitcher who resembles Girimekhala in a game of baseball.

See also
Gajasura
Gajasurasamhara

References

Buddhist legendary creatures
Mythological elephants
Elephants in Buddhism